Platypolia loda is a species of cutworm or dart moth in the family Noctuidae. It is found in North America.

The MONA or Hodges number for Platypolia loda is 9978.

Subspecies
These two subspecies belong to the species Platypolia loda:
 Platypolia loda gunderi Barnes & Benjamin, 1927
 Platypolia loda loda

References

Further reading

 
 
 

Xylenini
Articles created by Qbugbot
Moths described in 1898